This article is a list of diseases of cotton (Gossypium spp.).

Bacterial diseases

Xanthomonas citri

Inner boll rot - Pantoea dispersa

Fungal diseases

Nematodes, parasitic

Viral diseases

(Also uncharacterized graft transmissible pathogens [GTP])

Phytoplasmal and spiroplasmal diseases

References

Common Names of Diseases, The American Phytopathological Society

Cotton
Cotton diseases